Nathu Patlachi Wadi is a village in Rahata taluka of Ahmednagar district in state of Maharashtra, India.

Demographics
Population of Nathu Patlachi Wadi is 1800. 952 are males and 848 are females.

See also
List of villages in Rahata taluka

References 

Villages in Ahmednagar district